A departmental boot image is a boot image for any computer that has been enhanced by adding some applications and passwords specific to a task or group or department in an organization.  This has many of the advantages of a thin client strategy, but can be done on any operating system base as long as the boot device is large enough to accommodate the boot and applications together.

A typical departmental Windows XP boot image is usually so large that it requires a DVD to store, and may be too large for network booting.  Accordingly, it is usually installed on a fixed or removable hard drive kept inside the machine, rather than installed over a network or from a ROM.

There are some boot image control complexity and total cost of operations advantages to using a departmental boot image instead of a common boot image for the entire organization, or a thin client:
all the capabilities of a full operating system are available, not just those of a thin client
applications with inflexible software licenses need not be paid for the entire organization, but can be paid only for the departments that actually use them and have them installed on their machines
applications that interact badly can be segmented so that an accounting program and an engineering program do not "clobber each other's libraries" or otherwise interfere as they would if both sets of applications were installed in one boot image
overall size of each boot image can be controlled to fit within network or removable disk limits

Disadvantages include the complexity of creating and managing several large boot images, and determining when a department needs to upgrade its applications.  If each user is allowed to do this on their own, then, the discipline soon degrades and the shop will be no easier to manage than one that consists of one-off computers with their own quirks, frequently requiring re-imaging and whose issues are not really diagnosable nor comparable to each other.  Some experts believe that any departmental boot image regime degrades rather quickly to this state without extraordinary discipline and controls, and advocate thin clients to ensure such control.

It is however increasingly possible to restrict users from installing "their own" applications on a standard boot image, and to automatically re-install when a variant boot image is detected.  While this would be draconian in a large organization with one boot image it is often quite acceptable when the boot image is maintained at a departmental level and users can request that it be upgraded with a minimum of bureaucracy and waiting.

Booting
Disk images